Nordic shooting with cross-country running or running biathlon (Norwegian: skogsløp med skyting, Swedish: springskytte, Danish: terrænløb) is a biathlon sport which combines running and shooting.

Norway 
In Norway, "skogsløp med skyting" (literally shooting with cross-country running) is a summer variant of the Nordic field biathlon where contenders compete in running and shooting with fullbore rifles. Competitions are held within Det frivillige Skyttervesen. The length of the running part is usually between 2 and 3 kilometers, and during the race shooting is done 2 to 3 times. Contrary to the winter variant, the firearms are not carried during the running part, but are instead stored in racks close to the shooting area. Field-Run competitions are arranged in either the "normal" or "sprint" format. The Norwegian normal program championship is arranged during the large yearly event Landsskytterstevnet, while the Norwegian sprint championship is held later in the autumn. Contrary to the other exercises in the organization, Nordic shooting with cross-country running and Nordic field biathlon competitors are divided into male and female competitive divisions.

Sweden 
In Sweden, "springskytte" (literally running with shooting) is a summer variant of pistol biathlon which combines pistol (or revolver) shooting with running. Competitions are sanctioned by the Swedish Pistol Shooting Association (Svenska Pistolskytteförbundet), and the Swedish Pistol Biathlon Championship has been held yearly since the start of the 1990s. Competitions are open to civilians, but has also been popular among police officers. Formerly, shooting with cross-country running using rifles was arranged by the Frivilliga Skytterörelsen.

Denmark 
In Denmark, "terrænløb" (lit. terrain run) competitions are arranged by the Danish Gymnastics and Sports Associations (DGI Shooting).

See also 
 Moose biathlon, another Nordic biathlon variant using fullbore rifles
 Biathlon
 Summer biathlon
 ISSF Target Sprint
 Biathlon orienteering

References 

 
Running
Shooting sports